Xylopia le-testui, also known as canzi, is a plant in the custard apple family Annonaceae. It was first described in 1920 by François Pellegrin. A recognized variety, X. l. var. longepilosa, known as endong, was described in 1969 by Annick Le Thomas.

Description        
It is an evergreen tree with brown bark growing up to 25 metres high.

Distribution
The species is native to Central Africa.

References

le-testui
Trees of Africa
Plants described in 1920